The 2016–17 SC Freiburg season is the 113th season in the football club's history and 17th overall season in the top flight of German football, the Bundesliga, having won the 2. Bundesliga in the previous season, therefore earning promotion. SC Freiburg will also participate in this season's edition of the domestic cup, the DFB-Pokal. It is the 62nd season for SC Freiburg in the Schwarzwald-Stadion, located in Freiburg im Breisgau, Germany. It covers a period from 1 July 2016 to 30 June 2017.

Players

Squad

Transfers

In

Out

Friendly matches

Kaiserstuhl-Cup

Competitions

Overview

Bundesliga

League table

Results summary

Results by round

Matches

DFB-Pokal

Statistics

Appearances and goals

|-
! colspan=14 style=background:#dcdcdc; text-align:center| Goalkeepers

|-
! colspan=14 style=background:#dcdcdc; text-align:center| Defenders

|-
! colspan=14 style=background:#dcdcdc; text-align:center| Midfielders

|-
! colspan=14 style=background:#dcdcdc; text-align:center| Forwards

|-
! colspan=14 style=background:#dcdcdc; text-align:center| Players transferred out during the season

Goalscorers

Last updated: 20 May 2017

Clean sheets

Last updated: 7 May 2017

Disciplinary record

Last updated: 13 May 2017

References

SC Freiburg seasons
Freiburg, SC